Wangcun is a town in Xiangyuan County in southeastern Shanxi province, China, located  northwest of the county seat and served by G55 Erenhot–Guangzhou Expressway. , it has 27 villages under its administration.

See also 
 List of township-level divisions of Shanxi

References 

Township-level divisions of Shanxi